The Maldives national under-17 football team is the under-17 football (soccer) team of the Maldives. The team participates in the U-17 football competitions in international football and is controlled by the Football Association of Maldives. The team has never qualified for the FIFA U-17 World Cup or the AFC U-16 Championship.

Tournament records

FIFA U-17 World Cup Record

AFC U-17 Asian Cup Record

SAFF U-16 Championship Record 

*Draws include knockout matches decided on penalty kicks.

under-17
Asian national under-17 association football teams